William F. Leitch (born October 10, 1975 in Mattoon, Illinois) is an American writer and the founding editor of the Gawker Media former sports blog Deadspin. Leitch is a national correspondent for MLB.com, a contributing editor at New York, critic at Grierson & Leitch, contributor to The New York Times, GQ, The Washington Post and NBC News and has published six books, including Catch, a novel, Life as a Loser, a memoir, God Save the Fan, a book of sports essays and Are We Winning?, a book about fatherhood and baseball. 

His fifth book, the novel How Lucky, was published by Harper in May 2021 and received an endorsement from author Stephen King. His sixth book, the novel The Time Has Come, will be published by Harper in May 2023.

Background
Leitch was born and raised in Mattoon, Illinois, which is also the setting of Catch. He attended the University of Illinois at Urbana–Champaign. While there, he was an editor at the university's paper, the Daily Illini. He now lives in Athens, Georgia.

One of Leitch's first brushes with fame came when he appeared on an early episode of Win Ben Stein's Money. In an excerpt from Life as a Loser, published on Blacktable.com, Leitch describes the experience of taping this episode within hours of being dumped by his fiancée (a fact that co-host Jimmy Kimmel included in Leitch's introduction).

Career

IronMinds.com
Life as a Loser appeared on Ironminds, an online magazine that existed from 1999-2002.

The Black Table
In January 2003, Leitch became a founding editor of the website The Black Table, with Eric Gillin, A.J. Daulerio and Aileen Gallagher. His Life As A Loser column ran online for five years and was ultimately compiled into a book of the same title, with a foreword written by Tom Perrotta.

Deadspin
In September 2005, Leitch became the founding editor of Deadspin, which quickly became one of the most popular independent sports blogs on the web, and has been profiled in Sports Illustrated and The New York Times. Leitch announced on June 5, 2008 that he would leave Deadspin at the end of the month to become a contributing editor at New York magazine. Deadspin would later shut down after an ownership dispute, and its writers would create Defector Media.

Other work
During the 2007 NCAA Tournament, Leitch wrote a daily column for TimesSelect, the paid section of The New York Times. During the 2007 baseball playoffs, Leitch wrote a daily column for The New York Times' web site.

Leitch was also the host of The Will Leitch Show for Sports Illustrated for two seasons. Guests included Guy Pearce, Lea Thompson, Dale Earnhardt Jr., Stephanie Beatriz, Andre Holland, Heidi Gardner and Sean Astin.

Leitch also cohosts Waitin' Since Last Saturday, a podcast about University of Georgia football. He also cohosts the movie review podcast Grierson & Leitch with his lifelong friend and film critic Tim Grierson. The duo also write features for the entertainment website Vulture. Leitch also cohosts the St. Louis Cardinals podcast Seeing Red with Bernie Miklasz.

Personal life 
Leitch lives in Athens, Georgia with his wife, designer Alexa Stevenson, and their two sons, William and Wynn.

Books authored
 
 
 
 
 
 The Time Has Come. Harper Books. 2023. .

References

External links
 The Will Leitch Experience
 Leitch on New York
 Leitch on Deadspin
 Leitch on The New York Times
 Life as a Loser column
 Grierson & Leitch website
 Grierson & Leitch podcast
 Seeing Red podcast
 Waitin' Since Last Saturday podcast

Living people
1975 births
American bloggers
American online publication editors
People from Mattoon, Illinois